Kowiai (Kuiwai) is an Austronesian language of the Bomberai Peninsula in New Guinea. According to the Atlas of Languages of Intercultural Communication in the Pacific and Asia, Kowiai is spoken in the coastal regions between Arguni and Etna bay.

Distribution
Locations within Kaimana Regency:

Kaimana District: Namatota and Bicari villages
Buruwai District: Pulau Adi and Nusa Ulang villages
Teluk Etna District: Kayu Merah village
Niraran District: Trikora village
Coa District: Sowa village
Kroy District
Kaimana City

References

Central Malayo-Polynesian languages
Languages of western New Guinea